Jiang Hu is a 2004 Hong Kong crime drama film revolving around Hong Kong gangs. It was directed by Wong Ching-po  and stars Andy Lau and Jacky Cheung, in their second collaboration after As Tears Go By, which is regarded as a thematic sequel to the latter. The film is also known as Blood Brothers in Singapore, and Triad Underworld in the United States.

Plot
Jiang Hu tells two stories simultaneously. The first is about a gang leader, Mr. Hung (played by Andy Lau), and the tensions that arise between him and his old friend and second-in-command, Lefty (played by Jacky Cheung), due to Mr. Hung's wife's recent childbirth. Now that Hung is with a child, Lefty feels that Hung should leave the gang business as he is now burdened with family and that will appear weak in character to their own under-bosses. Lefty also believes that it is his own turn to run the business in his own direction. However, Hung is unhappy with Lefty's leadership style of fear and brutality to keep his underlings in line, and is hesitant to cede power to Lefty. To further complicate matters, news of Hung becoming a father has spread unrest amongst his under-bosses, and there are rumours that someone has placed a hit on Mr. Hung. Suspicion as to who is plotting against Mr. Hung has been placed on three leading underbosses, resulting in Lefty sending loyal henchmen going on a hunt to locate and kill the bosses; one is killed and Mr Hung's henchmen save the other two on Mr Hung's orders. In the end, it is alluded that the guilty party attempts to call off the hit under the guise of checking on his family, however he was unable to follow through with the action after he was assured by Hung's henchman that his family is safe and untouched.

The second story is about two teenage low ranking gang members named Yik and Turbo, who are hoping to gain respect and rank in the gangs by performing a hit on a gang leader. The gang leader is not displayed in the movie, and the audience is led to believe that Yik and Turbo are planning to murder Mr. Hung. Yik frequents a brothel whom he has a crush on one of the prostitutes that work there while Turbo starts trouble with other gang members which results in him losing the function of his right hand. He was about to be forced into an act of bestiality with a dog but before this can occur Yik rescues Turbo. However the traumatic experience leads Turbo to begin to act in a merciless fashion. Finally, Yik and Turbo proceed to perform the hit on the unnamed gang leader. This story-line details their journey together up until the assassination, and displays the friendship between the two.

The film ends with Mr. Hung confronting Lefty in a restaurant and revealing that it was Lefty that leaked the news of Hung being a father. It is now revealed that Yik and Turbo are in fact Hung and Lefty during their youth. After they reconcile their differences, they realize they have been surrounded by assassins. In a final act of friendship, Hung and Lefty proceed to fend off hordes of assassins before eventually collapsing to their wounds and finished off by a group of grunts. It then shows the killing of the gang leader by Yik and Turbo. The final scene show Yik explaining how he managed to gain power and respect by completing the assassination of the gang leader and then showing the complete transition of Yik into Hung; suggesting that the cycle will continue with the pair of assassins that had successfully killed Hung and Lefty and is on their way to power and respect.

Cast

 Andy Lau as Hung Yan-jau
 Jacky Cheung as Lefty
 Shawn Yue as Wing
 Edison Chen as Turbo
 Jacklyn Wu as Mrs. Hung
 Eric Tsang as Tall Man
 Norman Chui as Big Lungs
 Lin Yuen as Yoyo
 Michael Miu as Figo
 Kara Hui as Wing's Mother
 Gordon Lam as Shing 
 Lam Suet as Officer
 Donna Chu as Figo's Wife
 Ha Ping as Lefty's Mum
 Tony Ho as Brother Lin
 Hugo Ng as Target Brother
 Chapman To as Brother To
 Wong Ching as Old Hui
  as Ming
 Iris Wong as Gorgeous
 Courtney Wu as Party Guest

Title
"Jiang hu" is the term for the fictional world in which many Chinese classical wuxia stories are set. The term can be translated literally as "rivers and lakes". Metaphorically it refers not to a physical place or geographic location but to the wild and romanticized domain of secret societies, gangs, fighters, entertainers, prostitutes, assassins, thieves, actors, beggars, and wanderers that is roughly the Chinese equivalent to the English terms "bohemian" and "the underworld".

In modern days, the term jianghu is frequently used to refer to the triads and the secret societies of gangsters.

Accolades

See also
 List of Hong Kong films
 Andy Lau filmography
 Jacky Cheung filmography

External links
 

2004 films
2004 crime drama films
Hong Kong crime drama films
Triad films
2000s Cantonese-language films
Media Asia films
2004 directorial debut films
Films produced by Andy Lau
Films directed by Wong Ching-po
Films set in Hong Kong
Films shot in Hong Kong
2000s Hong Kong films